John Hoffman (February 19, 1835 – December 18, 1893) was a German American politician in Chicago who served as the Republican Sheriff of Cook County from 1878 to 1880. An immigrant from Hesse Darmstadt and a veteran of the American Civil War, Hoffman returned to Chicago following his military service and engaged in business, including the ownership of a livery stable in the city. He was a member of the Chicago Board of Trade and active in Republican political circles. Hoffman was elected Sheriff by a margin of 4,000 votes and served a single term before Republicans lost the 1879 elections.

References

1835 births
1893 deaths
Illinois Republicans
19th-century American politicians
Sheriffs of Cook County, Illinois